Jodaqayah (also Romanized as Jodāqāyah, Jodāqayah, Jodā Qāyeh, and Jedāqayeh; also known as  Jidāqiyeh, Joda Ghayeh, and Jodā Qeyeh) is a village in Chaharduli-ye Sharqi Rural District, Chaharduli District, Qorveh County, Kurdistan Province, Iran. At the 2006 census, its population was 207, in 51 families. The village is populated by Kurds.

References 

Towns and villages in Qorveh County
Kurdish settlements in Kurdistan Province